Renata Drössler (born 16 September 1963) is a singer and actress, known particularly for her stage performances at Divadlo pod Palmovkou, which she joined in the late 1990s. Prior to her engagement at Pod Palmovkou, she spent six years at the Semafor theatre in Prague. Drössler belongs to the Polish minority in the Czech Republic, having been born in the town of Třinec in the Zaolzie region. She is an alumna of Juliusz Słowacki Polish Gymnasium.

Selected filmography
Válka barev (1993)
Magda, její ztráty a nálezy (1996)
Policajti z předměstí (television, 1999)
 (television, 2004)
 (television, 2013)

References

External links

1974 births
Living people
Musicians from Třinec
Czech television actresses
Polish television actresses
Czech film actresses
Polish film actresses
Czech stage actresses
Polish stage actresses
21st-century Czech women singers
20th-century Czech actresses
20th-century Polish actresses
21st-century Czech actresses
21st-century Polish actresses
Polish people from Zaolzie
21st-century Polish women singers
21st-century Polish singers